NK Đerzelez was a Bosnian football club from Sarajevo during the Kingdom of Yugoslavia and in more recent times, Zenica.

History

The football club was formed in 1912 as Đerzelez Sarajevo.

Đerzelez (also known as Sarajevski), was one of the first soccer teams ever to exist in Sarajevo, and indeed entire Bosnia and Herzegovina region, along with FK Osman, SAŠK, who were considered a powerhouse team back then, Slavija and Makabi Sarajevo (also known as Barkohba).

The club reformed in nineties after the independence of Bosnia and Herzegovina.

Đerzelez managed to finish 6th during 1999–2000 First League of Bosnia and Herzegovina which enabled the club to play against Zrinjski in order to qualify for 2000 UEFA Intertoto Cup competition, but failed to advance. In 1999 they merged with NK Zenica to form NK Đerzelez Zenica.  The club competed in First League of the Federation of Bosnia and Herzegovina and in 2000–01 season of Premier League of Bosnia and Herzegovina finishing dead last with 40 defeats from 42 games played.

The club dissolved in 2001 and is inactive from professional football.

References

foot.dk 
weltfussballarchiv 

Defunct football clubs in Bosnia and Herzegovina
Sport in Zenica
2001 disestablishments in Bosnia and Herzegovina